Tiruchuli taluk is a taluk of Virudhunagar district of the Indian state of Tamil Nadu. The headquarters of the taluk is the town of Tiruchuli.

Demographics
According to the 2011 census, the taluk of Tiruchuli had a population of 103,068 with 51,886 males and 51,182 females. There were 986 women for every 1,000 men. The taluk had a literacy rate of 67.57%. Child population in the age group below 6 years were 5,406 Males and 5,081 Females.

References 

Taluks of Virudhunagar district